Raymond Ferguson (born 16 February 1941) is a Northern Irish former rugby union player with Ulster Rugby and a politician with the Ulster Unionist Party (UUP).

Early life and career
Part of a well established Ulster Unionist family in his native County Fermanagh, Ferguson represented his province at rugby. He studied law at Queen's University, Belfast and subsequently practised as a solicitor, initially in Belfast and then Coleraine before establishing his own still extant legal partnership in Enniskillen.

Politics
Ferguson gained his first elected office in 1977 when he was elected to Fermanagh District Council. He held a seat on the body until 2005. He served as Council Chairman from 1981 to 1983. He was chosen as UUP candidate for the Fermanagh and South Tyrone constituency for the 1979 general election although the seat was retained by sitting Independent Republican MP Frank Maguire. Ferguson was elected to the Northern Ireland Assembly in 1982 for Fermanagh and South Tyrone.

Following the collapse of the Assembly Ferguson became a leading voice in support of the restoration of devolution and in 1988 advocated the adoption by the UUP of a policy in favour of negotiation with constitutional Irish nationalists on both sides of the border. His views were rejected at the annual UUP conference however. The suggestion was labelled a "Lundy-like attack on the leadership" of the party by fellow Fermanagh delegate Sammy Foster.

However Ferguson's moderate views made him popular with the Republic of Ireland's political leaders and he was offered a seat in the Seanad Éireann. He declined the offer due to his opposition to the Anglo-Irish Agreement. Nonetheless his support for cross-community politics continued and in 1992 he publicly criticised colleagues on Fermanagh Council for their refusal to rotate the Council chairmanship with the nationalist Social Democratic and Labour Party.

References

1941 births
Living people
Ulster Rugby players
Ulster Unionist Party councillors
Northern Ireland MPAs 1982–1986
Members of Fermanagh District Council
Solicitors from Northern Ireland
Alumni of Queen's University Belfast
People from County Fermanagh